The 2006–07 FA Trophy was the thirty-eighth season of the FA Trophy.

Preliminary round

Ties

Replays

1st qualifying round

Ties

Replays

2nd qualifying round

Ties

Replays

3rd qualifying round
The teams from Conference North and Conference South entered in this round.

Ties

Replays

1st round
The teams from Conference National entered in this round.

Ties

Replays

2nd round

Ties

Replays

3rd round

Ties

Replays

Fourth round
Ties played on 24  and 25 February 2007.

Semi-finals
The two-legged ties were played on 10 and 17 March 2007.

First legs

Second legs

Kidderminster win 4–3 on aggregate

Stevenage win 3–1 on aggregate

Final

References

General
 Football Club History Database: FA Trophy 2006-07

Specific

2006–07 domestic association football cups
League
2006-07